Carabus obsoletus uhligi is a subspecies of ground beetle in the subfamily Carabinae that can be found in Hungary and Romania.

References

obsoletus uhligi
Beetles described in 1910
Beetles of Europe